Pherotrichis is a plant genus in the family Apocynaceae, first described as a genus in 1838. It is native to Mexico and Arizona.

Species
 Pherotrichis leptogenia B.L.Rob. - Jalisco
 Pherotrichis mixtecana Brandegee - Oaxaca 
 Pherotrichis schaffneri A.Gray - San Luis Potosí, Cochise County in Arizona

formerly included
moved to Matelea 
Pherotrichis villosa (Schult.) Meisn, synonym of  Matelea balbisii (Decne.) Woodson.

References

Apocynaceae genera
Asclepiadoideae
Taxa named by Joseph Decaisne